The Anglican Bishop of Colombo is  the ecclesiastical head of the Anglican Diocese of Colombo, a diocese in the Church of Ceylon which is part of the Anglican Communion. The Anglican Diocese of Colombo was founded in 1845, as the diocese of the Church of England in Ceylon.

List of bishops

Footnotes

Publications
 One hundred years in Ceylon, or, The centenary volume of the Church Missionary Society in Ceylon, 1818-1918 (1922) Author: Balding, John William Madras: Printed at the Diocesan Press.
 The Church of Ceylon - her faith and mission Published in 1945, Printed at the Daily News Press by Bernard de Silva for the Church of Ceylon.
The Church of Ceylon: A history, 1945-1995  Editor:   	 Medis, Frederick Published for the Diocese of Colombo.

External links
 Official Web Site of Church of Ceylon, Diocese of Colombo
 The Church of Ceylon (Anglican Communion)
 Anglican Church of Ceylon News
 Worship Resources including a Prayer for Sri Lanka written by Metropolitan Lakdasa de Mel and prayers written by the Bishop of Colombo
 The Church of Ceylon - World Council of Churches website

 
1845 establishments in Ceylon